Estadio Dr. Óscar Monterroso Izaguirre, is a multi-purpose stadium in Retalhuleu, Guatemala.  It is mainly used mostly for football matches and hosts the home matches of Deportivo Reu of the Guatemalan Primera División de Ascenso.  The stadium has a capacity of 8,000 spectators.

References

Multi-purpose stadiums in Guatemala
Football venues in Guatemala